Lifestar is an aeromedical transport service of the University of Tennessee Medical Center that provides regional rapid transportation of injured patients. Lifestar transports approximately 200 patients per month.

Fleet
Lifestar's fleet consists of two Eurocopter EC135 helicopters, and three Bell 407s. The helicopters are equipped with all the features of a ground ambulance, with additions of 12 lead EKGs, and chemical blood analysis kits. The helicopters accommodate one Federal Aviation Administration certified pilot, one flight paramedic, one flight nurse, and room enough for one patient.

Bases
Lifestar administrative offices and the dispatch center are located at the University of Tennessee Medical Center in Knoxville. Lifestar currently operates 5 bases in the region:  Lifestar 1 is based in Morristown, Tennessee at the Morristown Regional Airport. Lifestar 5 is based in Sweetwater, Tennessee just off of I-75 exit 60. Lifestar 3 is based in Sevierville, Tennessee at the Gatlinburg-Pigeon Forge Airport. Lifestar 4 is based in Jacksboro, Tennessee at the Campbell County Airport (Tennessee). Lifestar 2 is based in Rockwood, Tennessee at the Rockwood Municipal Airport.

Activation
Initiation of a Lifestar flight may come by way of medical or law enforcement personnel, initiated at either the accident site, or from a referring hospital. Justifications for aeromedical flight may be specialties not available at the referring location, prolonged ground transportation, or adverse road conditions.

External links 

Air ambulance services in the United States
Airlines based in Tennessee